Damien Degboe is a Beninese Olympic middle-distance runner. He represented his country in the men's 1500 meters at the 1980 Summer Olympics. His time was a 4:15.30.

References

Living people
Beninese male middle-distance runners
Olympic athletes of Benin
Athletes (track and field) at the 1980 Summer Olympics
Year of birth missing (living people)